Electromechanical disintegration is a process in geomorphology in which lightning interacts in erosion and weathering.

An excellent example of this phenomenon is fracturing in the quartz formations of the Espinaςo mountains of Brazil. For many years, itinerant miners in these mountains have reported the appearance of broken boulders and fissures along the ground after lightning storms.

The Espinaςo Range represents a typical site for orographic thunderstorms, which develop from the ascent of air along mountain ranges. These storms have the highest rate of lightning occurrence and are therefore useful for studying the effects of such atmospheric discharges.

For this reason, cracks caused by solar radiation or fire can be ruled out.

An enormous pressure of about  can be estimated by the presence of coesite relicts, the rare high-pressure polymorph of quartz.

This lightning-induced weathering is one of the more important starting mechanisms for other weathering processes. Because of the increase in surface area, chemical weathering can attack each newly made fragment from all sides and can go deeper into bedrock as new cracks are formed or older ones extended. Thus, electromechanical disintegration is a new term for a type of weathering as old as the planet's lithosphere, and it represents an important exogenic process for the beginning of erosion and the formation of soils.

See also  
Fulgurite

Notes

References

 Banko, A. G., J. Karfunkel, W. Hadrian, and F. Noack. 2002. "Brasilianische Blitzquarze - Die ungewöhnlichen Zeugen eines alltäglichen Naturschauspiels" ("Brazilian Lightning-quartz - The Unusual Witnesses of an Everyday Nature Show"), Aufschluss, no. Jan./Feb.,  53:25-36. Heidelberg.
 Karfunkel, J., J. Addad, A. G. Banko, W. Hadrian, and D. B. Hoover. 2001. "Electromechanical disintegration - an important weathering process", Z Geomorphol N F,  no. 3,  45:345-357. Berlin-Stuttgart.
 Karfunkel, J., J. Addad, A. G. Banko, W. Hadrian, F. Noack, and D. B. Hoover. 1999. "Transição de quartzo-alfa para quartzo-beta em conseqüência de descargas atmosféricas: exemplo de quartzo gemológico em depósitos coluvionares" ("Transition of Quartz-alpha into Quartz-beta as a Consequence of Atmospheric Discharge"), Revista da Escola de Minas de Ouro Preto, no. 3, 52:166-171. Ouro Preto.
 Karfunkel, J., M. L. S. C. Chaves, A. G. Banko, W. Hadrian, F. Noack, and J. Schönau. 1998. "Vom Blitz getroffen: Quarze aus Brasilien" ("Struck by Lightning: Quartz from Brazil"), Mineralien Welt (Minerals World),  no. 5,  9:54-60.
 Karfunkel, J., A. G. Banko, W. Hadrian, D. B. Hoover, J. Addad, M. S. Martins, R. Scholz, and B. Peregovich. 2000. Die Elektromechanische Zersetzung am Beispiel des Espinhaço-Gebirges, Zentral-Ost Brasilien" ("The Electromechanical Transition in an Example of Espinhaço Mountains, Central-East Brazil" ), XVI Geowissenschaftliches Lateinamerika Kolloquium (16th Geological Latin-American Colloquium), Stuttgart, 2000.
 Karfunkel, J., A. G. Banko, J. Addad, M. S. Dantas, M. Pimenta, M. Pinheiro, K. Krambrock, W. Hadrian, and D. B. Hoover. 2000. "High P/T silica polymorphs due to atmospheric discharges", General Symposium 8-6/ Mineralogy, Physics and Chemistry of Minerals, XXXI International Geological Congress, Rio de Janeiro, 2000, M57-M57.
 Karfunkel, J., M. V. B. Pinheiro, K. Krambrock, F. S. Lameiras, A. G. Banko, and W. Hadrian. 2000. "Temperature-time bleaching reaction in smoky quartz: nature and experiment", General Symp. 6-8/ Mineralogy, Physics and Chemistry of Minerals,  XXXI International Geological Congress, Rio de Janeiro, 2000.
 Karfunkel, J., J. Addad, A. G. Banko, B. Peregovich, and D. B. Hoover. 1999. "Fracturing and disintegration of rocks due to atmospheric discharges", AGU-1999 Fall Meeting, American Geophysical Union - 1999 Fall Meeting, San Francisco, 1999,  79:32-32.
 Karfunkel, J., A. G. Banko, and D. B. Hoover. 1998. "A contribution to physical weathering", AGU-1998 Fall Meeting, American Geophysical Union - 1998 Fall Meeting, San Francisco, 1998, 79:F126-F126.
 Karfunkel, J., A. G. Banko, M. L. S. C. Chaves, and J. Addad. 1998. "Shock deformation of rocks due to lightning discharges", AGU-1998 Spring Meeting, American Geophysical Union - 1998 Spring Meeting, San Francisco, 1998, 79:32-32.
 Karfunkel, J., M. L. S. C. Chaves, A. G. Banko, W. Hadrian, F. Noack, and J. Schönau. 1998. "The effects of electrical discharge energy on quartz and its importance as a geological process", Simpósio 14 - Mineralogia e Gemologia, XL Congresso Brasileiro De Geologia - EXPOGEO 98, Belo Horizonte, 1998, 297-297 Belo Horizonte: SBG-MG.
 Karfunkel, J., M. L. S. C. Chaves, and A. G. Banko. 1996. "Natural shock-induced deformation: neither volcanic nor of meteorite impact origin", American Geophysical Union - 1996,  San Francisco, 1996, 77:89-89.

Geomorphology